Muhammad ibn Ja'far al-Sadiq, surnamed al-Dibaj ("the handsome"), the younger full brother of Musa al-Kadhim, and son of Ja'far al-Sadiq appeared in Mecca in the year 200 A.H. / 815 C.E., in the aftermath of the revolt of Abu'l-Saraya, claiming that he was the Awaited Mahdi. He believed in a Zaydi Shia type of Imamate and declared himself as the Caliph of the Muslims and took the oath of allegiance from them and was called the Leader of the faithful. He was recognized as the Imam by a small group of followers. His followers became denominated as the Shumaytiyya (Sumaytiyya) after their leader Yahya ibn Abi’l-Shumayt (al-Sumayt). However, his revolt against the Caliph al-Ma'mun proved unsuccessful in the very same year it started (i.e. 815 C.E.). He ended his revolt by abdicating and publicly confessing his error and was then banished from the Hejaz and the Tihamah.

Al-Dibaj died in 203 A.H. / 818 C.E., and was buried near Bastam, Iran. The Abbasid caliph Al-Ma'mun himself was present until the burial was over and said the final prayer on the bier.

Descendants

Isma'il & Ja'far
They were present at the cemetery, attending to the funeral and burial ceremonies of their father Muhammad bin Ja'far.

Yahya
According to Al-Ma'mun, Yahya was somewhere in Egypt at the time of his father's death. It is possible he was opposed to the Abbasid caliphate.

Ali
Known as Al-Harisi. He had settled permanently in Shiraz since the exile of his father's family from Medina. Seven generations of his descendants lived and multiplied in Shiraz and some are known to have accompanied armies of Mahmud of Ghazni to India.

Al-Qasim
Al-Dibaj had a son named Al-Qasim, who in turn had three children: Umm Kulthum (d.868), Abdallah (d.875) and Yahya (d.877). Al-Qasim and his family went to live in Egypt after the failure of Al-Dibaj's revolt and were among the first Alid families to resettle in Egypt.

Legacy and Tomb

Al-Dibaj's followers, the Shumaytiyya or Sumaytiyya, believed that the Imamate would remain with his family and that the Mahdi would come from among his family.

Muhammad al-Dibaj was buried in Jurjan, Iran (near Bastam, Iran) and his grave soon became a site of pilgrimage and known as "qabr al-da'i" (Grave of the Da'i/Missionary). In 900 CE, Muhammad ibn Zayd, the Zaydi ruler of Tabaristan, was killed in battle by the Sunni Samanids and subsequently beheaded. His head was sent to the Samanid court located in Bukhara while his "headless torso (badan)" was sent to Jurjan to be buried in Muhammad al-Dibaj's burial site. According to the historian Al-Qummi, in 984 AD, a "a proper structure (turba) [on the burial site of Dibaj and Muhammad ibn Zayd's body] was erected only on the orders of the Buyid wazīr al-Ṣāḥib".

See also
Fourth Fitna
People claiming to be the Mahdi
Descendants of Ali ibn Abi Talib

References

Sources
Al-Maqalat wa al-Firaq, by Sa'ad Ibn Abdillah al-Ash'ari al-Qummi (d. 301), pg.80
 
 

Husaynids
Zaydi imams
Self-declared messiahs
818 deaths
Year of birth unknown
8th-century Arabs
9th-century Arabs
Rebels from the Abbasid Caliphate
9th-century people from the Abbasid Caliphate
Fourth Fitna
9th-century Shia Muslims